Yehudah "Yeedle" Werdyger (born 1971) is an American Hasidic Jewish singer. He is the son of singer Mordechai Werdyger (stage name: Mordechai Ben David, MBD) and grandson of the cantor David Werdyger.

Yeedle (יידל) is a Yiddish diminutive of the Hebrew name Yehudah

Production
Werdyger's fifth album, Lev Echad, included compositions by Akiva Homnick, Aharon Razel, and Werdyger cowriting with Eli Laufer.

Werdyger has produced his father Mordechai Ben David's albums starting from 2001; albums produced include:
Maaminim Bnei Maaminim
Kumzitz
Efshar Letaken
Kulam Ahuvim

Family
Werdyger is the son of Mordechai Ben David and grandson of David Werdyger. His uncle Mendy Werdyger is a singer and music producer.

Discography

Main albums
Together (1993)
Laasos Retzon Avicha (1995)
Shiru Lamelech (Sing for the King) (1998)
Yeedle IV (2002)
Lev Echod (One Heart) (2008)
A Verdiger Yid (2013)

Collaboration albums
Just One Shabbos (1982)
Jerusalem All Star Cast (1983) 
That Special Melody (1988)
The Double Album (1990)
HASC 5 - A Time for Music (1992)
Three Generations (1993)Special Moments (1994)Solid Gold - Volume 1 (1997)Yachad (1999)Chazak! - Live at the Jacob Javits Center NY (2011)HASC 15 - A Time for Music (2002)A Day of Shabbat and Rest (2005)Shira Chadasha (2015)Shabbos with the Werdyger Family (2006)Shabbos With the Werdygers II (2010)HASC 26 - A Time For Music (2013)
Boruch Sholom Blesofsky, Bishvili'' (2015)

References

Hasidic entertainers
Hasidic singers
Yiddish-language singers of the United States
Jewish American musicians
American Orthodox Jews
Musicians from Brooklyn
1971 births
Living people
People from Sea Gate, Brooklyn
Werdyger family